The CRO Race (formally: Tour of Croatia) is a men's road cycling stage race that takes place in Croatia since 2015. It is part of the UCI Europe Tour and is rated by the UCI as a 2.1 event, the third tier of professional stage races. The event is organised by Top Sport Events of Vladimir Miholjević, a former professional cyclist. The race was originally held in April in the build-up to the Giro d'Italia, but from 2019 race is held in September and October.

History

2015
Stages of 2015:
 Makarska - Split
 Šibenik - Zadar
 Plitvice Lakes - Učka mountain
 Pula - Umag
 Sveti Martin na Muri - Zagreb

2016
Stages of 2016:
 Osijek - Varaždin
 Plitvice Lakes - Split
 Makarska - Šibenik
 Crikvenica - Učka
 Poreč - Umag (Team time trial)
 Sveti Martin na Muri - Zagreb

2017
Stages of 2017:
 Osijek - Koprivnica
 Trogir - Biokovo (Sveti Jure)
 Imotski - Zadar
 Crikvenica - Umag
 Poreč - Učka (Poklon)
 Samobor - Zagreb

2018
The 2018 edition, was the only that has receive a rating of the 2.HC to date.<br/ >
Stages of 2018:
 Osijek - Koprivnica
 Karlovac - Zadar
 Trogir/Okrug - Makarska Riviera/Biokovo(Sveti Jure) (Stage was shortened due the bad weather)
 Starigrad - Crikvenica
 Rabac - Učka
 Samobor - Zagreb

2019
Stages of 2019:
 Osijek - Lipik
 Slunj - Zadar
 Okrug - Makarska
 Starigrad - Paklenica - Crikvenica
 Rabac - Platak
 Sveta Nedelja - Zagreb

2020
The 2020 edition was cancelled due to the COVID-19 pandemic.

2021
Stages of 2021:
 Osijek - Varaždin
 Slunj - Otočac
 Primošten - Makarska
 Zadar - Crikvenica
 Rabac/Labin - Opatija
 Samobor - Zagreb

2022 
Stages of 2022:
 Osijek - Ludbreg
 Otočac - Zadar
 Sinj -  Primošten
 Biograd na Moru - Crikvenica
 Opatija - Labin
 Sveta Nedelja - Zagreb

Classifications
The jerseys worn by the leaders of the individual classifications are:
 - Red / White checkered Jersey – Worn by the leader of the general classification. 
 - Blue Jersey – Worn by the leader of the points classification. 
 - Green Jersey – Worn by the leader of the climbing classification. 
 - White Jersey – Worn by the best rider under 23 years of age on the overall classification.

Overall winners

References

External links
 

 
UCI Europe Tour races
Cycle races in Croatia
Recurring sporting events established in 2015
2015 establishments in Croatia
Annual sporting events in Croatia
Spring (season) events in Croatia